KingGee (formerly known as King Gee) is an Australian work wear brand. The name is said to have originated from the reigning monarch at the time, King George V, and was an expression that meant 'tops' or 'the best'. It was established in Sydney in 1926 by Robert Adcock. The brand initially produced overalls, but has since grown its products to supply a large range of work wear (including Workcool and Tradies ranges), footwear and accessories.

History 
In March 1926, a trade mark application for King Gee was successfully made  by Robert Adcock of Concord in Sydney. The trademark was to cover "articles of clothing, including overalls".

After its conception, the brand took off and grew to supply the uniforms for the defense services during World War Two.  

KingGee was acquired by Pacific Brands, then later was bought by Wesfarmers as part of the Workwear Group in 2014.

References 

Australian companies established in 1926
Clothing companies established in 1926
Clothing brands of Australia
Wesfarmers
Workwear